The Journal of Magnetic Resonance (JMR) is a monthly peer-reviewed scientific journal that publishes original research in the field of magnetic resonance, including nuclear magnetic resonance, electron paramagnetic resonance, magnetic resonance imaging, magnetic resonance spectroscopy and nuclear quadrupole resonance.  Since 2021, its editor-in-chief has been Tatyana Polenova of the University of Delaware. According to the Journal Citation Reports, it has an impact factor of 2.624. Authors can pay a fee to have their articles published as open access.

History
Since its establishment in 1969, the journal has been published under different names:
 Journal of Magnetic Resonance, (1969–1992) 
 Journal of Magnetic Resonance, Series A, (1993–1996) 
 Journal of Magnetic Resonance, Series B, (1993–1996) 
 Journal of Magnetic Resonance, (1997–present)

Most cited articles
According to the Web of Science, as of November 2016, there are 24 articles published in the Journal of Magnetic Resonance that have been cited more than 1,000 times. The four articles that have been cited the most, with more than 2,500 citations, are:
  – cited 4,318 times.
  – cited 3,187 times.
  – cited 2,980 times.
  – cited 2,537 times.

Abstracting and Indexing
The Journal of Magnetic Resonance is abstracted and indexed in:
Chemical Abstracts
Current Contents/Physics, Chemical & Earth Sciences
Index to Scientific Reviews
Science Abstracts
Science Citation Index
Scopus

References

External links 
 

Elsevier academic journals
Chemistry journals
Publications established in 1969
Monthly journals
English-language journals